EMCF is a four-letter acronym that may refer to:

Edna McConnell Clark Foundation
European Monetary Cooperation Fund
European Multilateral Clearing Facility N.V.